Gorey is a townland situated midway between Dungannon and Ballygawley in County Tyrone. It is in the Parish of Donaghmore and contains 280 acres.

Townlands of County Tyrone